Duckie is a collective of performance artists that describes itself as "a Post Gay independent arts outfit." They produce a mix of so-called "cultural interventions", such as club nights, new-mode pop, burlesque and performance events, as well as anti-theatre experimentation. They have described their work as "mixing the arthouse with the dosshouse" and putting "highbrow performance in backstreet pubs and lowbrow performance in posh theatres".

Supported by grants from the British Council and Arts Council England, Duckie is based in London but has played in Berlin, Germany, Greece and Tokyo as well as the Edinburgh Festival Fringe, Blackpool Tower Ballroom and the Sydney Opera House.

Duckie's work is characterised by its engagement with the queer lifestyle and community, showcasing queer performers and performance art at its weekly Saturday club night and providing "a creative forum for alternative gay and lesbian performance and culture".

The company's outlook is distinctly working-class, drawing influences in John McGrath, the Victorian music hall, punk culture and illegitimate theatre.

Background
The collective dates back to a club night called Duckie that started in November 1995 in the south London pub Royal Vauxhall Tavern (RVT), created by producer Simon Casson and compere Amy Lamé.

In a 2007 article for Time Out, Paul Burston wrote that at the start of Duckie's tenure the RVT was somewhat in decline: "Lack of investment meant the venue remained dark during the week, only coming to life at the weekend with Duckie and ... the Dame Edna Experience."  Burston also records that the opening of the gay nightclub Crash promoted Vauxhall's potential for hosting such ventures, leading to an influx of mainstream clubs into the historic gay area.

Despite this, and the potential in new audiences attracted by the larger clubs, Duckie's growth was again challenged in 1998 when Lambeth London Borough Council and property developer CLS Holdings attempted to flatten the RVT to make way for a supermarket complex.  Duckie was instrumental in defeating this threat: as Burston notes "The performance club Duckie, which had breathed new life into Saturday nights, mounted a vigorous press campaign, protesting outside Lambeth Town Hall and saving it from the bulldozers."  In 2005, businessmen Paul Oxley and James Lindsay bought the RVT at public auction, bringing new investment to the venue and securing the site as a bar and nightclub.

Performance events 
In December 2002, Duckie's C'est Vauxhall Christmas show at the Royal Vauxhall Tavern created the format of sitting guests at tables and offering them the chance to order short acts, using "Duckie dollars", from a menu. In December 2003, this was recreated as C'est Barbican at The Pit theatre venue at the Barbican Centre. It won four awards including an Olivier Award for best entertainment show and returned to the Barbican in 2004. The show toured to the Sydney Opera House as well as Berlin, Thessaloniki, Birmingham and Manchester. In December 2007, this show was recreated as C'est Duckie! at the Clemente Soto Velez Cultural and Educational Center, on New York City's Lower East Side.

In 2006, Duckie created The Class Club at The Pit, a piece of event theatre that asked the audience to pre-select a social class for themselves, dress appropriately for the evening and then enjoy a meal and entertainment for their chosen grouping.

Cabaret performer Ursula Martinez has worked as part of Duckie, and it has also attracted performers such as Dusty Limits, Janice Connolly, Scott Capurro, Kiki and Herb and George Chakravarthi.

References

External links
 Duckie's official website
 Duckie's original website 1996-2014

Theatre companies in the United Kingdom
Cabaret
Performance artist collectives